Alvin is a champion trotting horse. He was foaled 1885, and died in 1927 at the age of 42.

Bred in Ontario, Canada, Alvin took his lifetime record of 2:11 in 1893 at Buffalo, New York, becoming the fastest ever Canadian-bred trotter. At the end of his career, he was exported to Russia to become a sire.

Alvin was inducted into the Canadian Horse Racing Hall of Fame in 2000.

References
 Alvin's page at the Canadian Horse Racing Hall of Fame

See also
Harness racing

1885 racehorse births
1927 racehorse deaths
Canadian Standardbred racehorses
Canadian Horse Racing Hall of Fame inductees